Borman is a lunar impact crater that is located in the southern hemisphere on the far side of the Moon. It lies across the southeast section of the mountainous inner ring, within the walled basin named Apollo.

The rim of Borman remains sharp-edged, although a smaller crater lies across its northwestern rim. The interior is rough but relatively flat. Borman L is an older and much more worn crater that is attached to the southern rim of Borman.

Borman crater is named after the American astronaut Frank Borman. In 1968, Borman and his Apollo 8 crewmates became the first humans to orbit the Moon. Two nearby craters are named after the other crew members, William Anders (Anders crater) and Jim Lovell (Lovell crater).

Satellite craters
By convention these features are identified on lunar maps by placing the letter on the side of the crater midpoint that is closest to Borman.

The following craters have been renamed by the IAU.

 Borman A — See McNair (crater).
 Borman X — See Resnik (crater).
 Borman Y — See McAuliffe (crater).
 Borman Z — See Jarvis (crater).

References

 
 
 
 
 
 
 
 
 
 
 
 

Impact craters on the Moon
Frank Borman